Kevin Hart: What The Fit is an American unscripted comedy starring Kevin Hart that airs on the Laugh Out Loud (LOL) Network on YouTube Premium.

In each episode, Kevin invites one of his celebrity friends to join him in taking on a different, wacky workout, ranging from sumo wrestling to trampoline dodgeball to attending training camp with the Los Angeles Rams.

The series was announced at YouTube's Brandcast event on May 5, 2017 and premiered on March 8, 2018. The first episode featured Conan O'Brien and Kevin trying to master sumo wrestling. The first season also featured workouts such as beer yoga with Chance the Rapper, roller fitness with Tiffany Haddish, goat yoga with Khloé Kardashian and visiting Muscle Beach with James Corden.

In May 2018, "Kevin Hart: What The Fit" was picked up for a second season. The second season premiered on February 7, 2019 and featured celebrities such as Rebel Wilson, Anna Kendrick and Kourtney Kardashian participating in workouts that included karate, trampoline dodgeball and batting practice with the Los Angeles Dodgers.

In addition to each episode, YouTube posts bonus content, including a collection of deleted scenes as well as a special workout with Kevin and his trainer, Ron "Boss" Everline.

In 2019, the Producers Guild of America nominated "Kevin Hart: What The Fit" for the award for Outstanding Short Form Program. The show won a Realscreen Award in the category of Digital Content - Web Series/Programs - Reality & Lifestyle on January 28, 2020. On June 8, 2020, Kevin Hart was nominated for the Critics' Choice Real TV Awards "Male Star of the Year" for his work on What The Fit.

What The Fit currently has over 461 million total views across all the episodes and related content to date. It was announced that YouTube renewed the show for a third season on May 2, 2019. The third season premiered on March 5, 2020. The third season features celebrity guests Nick Jonas, Jimmy Kimmel and Mindy Kaling, among many others.

The series is produced by Pulse Creative and Hartbeat Productions in association with Lionsgate and the LOL Network. Matt Kunitz, Kevin Hart, David Shumsky, Rebecca Shumsky Quinn, Pip Wells, Jeff Clanagan and Mark J. Harris serve as executive producers.

Episodes

Season 1

Season 2

Season 3

Awards and nominations

References

External links
Official Website

YouTube
2018 American television series debuts
2020 American television series debuts
Television series by Lionsgate Television
YouTube Premium original series